The Diocese of North America & Europe is a diocese of the Malankara Mar Thoma Syrian Church that includes all the parishes in the North American and European continents. Its headquarters is at Sinai Mar Thoma Centre, Merrick, New York.The present Diocesan bishop is Issac Mar Philoxenos Episcopa. As of  2020 there are 71 parishes and 7 congregations under this diocese.

Mar Thoma Church
The Mar Thoma Church defines itself as "apostolic in origin, catholic in nature, biblical in faith, evangelical in principle, ecumenical in outlook, oriental in worship, democratic in function, episcopal in character, and is a theologically Reformed church.

Beginning of parishes in England

During this period the community was supported by the following clergy - Rev. V V Alexander; Rt Rev. Joseph Mar Thoma; Very Rev. P M George; Rt Rev. Easow Mar Timotheus and Rev. Dr Philip Varghese. Rev. Dr Abrham Philip, the first vicar was appointed in 1982.  1.

Early history of the Diocese
The Philipose Mar Chrysostom then took charge as Diocesan bishop.

Mar Thoma Centre
In the 1990s the Diocesan Assembly decided to permanently house the Diocese. In 1994 the Assembly initially purchased property at Richboro, Pennsylvania, for their headquarters, but subsequently moved to their current location at 2320 South Merrick Avenue, Merrick, New York.
In the October of 2018, the Diocese of North America and Europe had purchased the Mount Carmel Christian Church in Tucker, Georgia which hosts the Mission activities of the Diocese. The name "Carmel Mar Thoma Center" was given at the current location at 6015 Old Stone Mountain Road, Stone Mountain, Georgia.

Diocesan bishops

 The Late Rt. Rev. Dr. Zacharias Mar Theophilus  (October 1993 – October 2001)
 Rt. Rev. Dr. Euyakim Mar Coorilos (October 2001 – December 2008)
 Rt. Rev. Dr. Geevarghese Mar Theodosius Episcopa (January 2009 – March 2016)
 The Rt. Rev. Dr. Isaac Mar Philoxenos Episcopa.( Incumbent from April 2016 – )

References

External links
Official Site of the Diocese of North America & Europe
Official web site of the Mission Board of the Diocese

Indian diaspora in Europe
Mar Thoma Syrian Church
Dioceses in Europe
Dioceses in North America